This is a list of the people born in, residents of, or otherwise closely associated with the American city of Jefferson City, Missouri, and its surrounding metropolitan area.

Arts & entertainment
Janet Beecher, actress of stage and screen; born in Jefferson City
Cedric the Entertainer (Cedric Kyle), actor/comedian; born in Jefferson City
Deborah Digges (born Deborah Sugarbaker), poet; born in Jefferson City
John Farris, author; born in Jefferson City
Arthur Frommer, travel writer, publisher, consumer advocate, and the founder of the Frommer's series of travel guides; born in Jefferson City
Chester Himes, author; born in Jefferson City
Kent Jones, writer and radio personality; attended Jefferson City public schools
Laura La Varnie, actress of the silent era; born in Jefferson City
William Rose, screenwriter known for writing Guess Who's Coming to Dinner; born in Jefferson City
Shaman's Harvest, hard rock band
Charlie Weber, film and television actor currently on How to Get Away with Murder

Business
John Opel, former president of IBM; attended Jefferson City public schools

Education
Lorenzo Greene, Lincoln University faculty and civil rights pioneer

Government
James T. Blair Jr., mayor of Jefferson City in 1947 and later governor of Missouri
Richard Everett Dorr, former U.S. federal judge; born in Jefferson City
Patricia A. Goodrich, member of the Wisconsin State Assembly; born in Jefferson City
John A. Gordon, former Deputy Director of the Central Intelligence Agency; born in Jefferson City
James Kirkpatrick, former Missouri Secretary of State; former editor of the Jefferson City News-Tribune
Stephen R. Leopold, former member of the Wisconsin State Assembly; born in Jefferson City
Blaine Luetkemeyer, U.S. Representative for Missouri's 3rd congressional district; born in Jefferson City and graduated from Lincoln University
Richard R. Nacy, former State Treasurer of Missouri; born and raised in Jefferson City
Karl L. Rundberg (1899–1969), Los Angeles City Council member
Rodney W. Sippel, United States federal judge; born in Jefferson City
Sarah Steelman, former State Treasurer of Missouri; born and raised in Jefferson City
Carl M. Vogel, former member of the Missouri Senate; born and raised in Jefferson City
Harold Volkmer, former member of the United States House of Representatives; born and raised in Jefferson City

Religion
Charles Roman Koester, former American Bishop of the Catholic Church; born in Jefferson City
Reginald Heber Weller, Episcopal priest and bishop active in the ecumenism; born in Jefferson City

Science
Brittany Friedman, sociologist; raised in Jefferson City and attended Jefferson City public schools
Jack S. Kilby, Nobel Prize-winning inventor and physicist; born in Jefferson City
William A. Massey, mathematician and operations researcher with expertise in queueing theory; born in Jefferson City
P. David Polly, vertebrate paleontologist; born in Jefferson City
David Sugarbaker, cancer surgeon most known for developing new surgical treatments of mesothelioma.

Sports
Mishael Abbott, race car driver; born in Jefferson City
OG Anunoby, forward for the Toronto Raptors; attended University of Indiana, attended Jefferson City High School
Charlie Brown, former NFL running back born in Jefferson City
Christian Cantwell, 2009 shot put world champion, born in Jefferson City
Joe Crede, major league baseball player, won 2005 World Series with Chicago White Sox; born in Jefferson City
John Daly, professional golfer on the PGA Tour
Justin Gage, former football player for the Chicago Bears and the Tennessee Titans; attended Jefferson City public schools
Tom Henke, major league baseball player, won 1992 World Series with Toronto Blue Jays, also pitched for the St. Louis Cardinals; lives in nearby Taos
Dennis Higgins, former professional pitcher; born in Jefferson City
Joe Jimenez, professional golfer best known for winning the 1978 PGA Seniors' Championship; was the club pro at the Jefferson City Country Club
Sam LeCure, current major league baseball player for the Cincinnati Reds; born near Jefferson City
Steve Martin, former football player; attended Jefferson City public schools
Napoleon McCallum, former running back for the Los Angeles Raiders in the National Football League; born in Jefferson City
Dennis Meyer, former Pittsburgh Steelers football player and coach; born in Jefferson City
Paul Miller, basketball player; born in Jefferson City
Maya Moore, former WNBA player for the Minnesota Lynx and Olympic gold medalist; born in Jefferson City and attended Jefferson City public schools
Clint Robinson, professional first baseman with the Los Angeles Dodgers
Steve Rogers, former starting pitcher for the Montreal Expos; born in Jefferson City
Justin Smith, former football player with the Cincinnati Bengals and San Francisco 49ers; born and raised in Jefferson City
Jamaal Tatum, former college basketball player for Southern Illinois Salukis; born and raised in Jefferson City
Don Webb, former college and Professional Football defensive back
Keith Weber, former quarterback and pitcher for the University of Missouri
Sylvester Williams, defensive tackle for the Detroit Lions; attended Jefferson City High School

Other
Alphonso Boone, pioneer who ran a trading post in Jefferson City
Suzette Haden Elgin, Linguist, inventor of Láadan; born in Jefferson City
Lloyd L. Gaines, plaintiff in Missouri ex rel. Gaines v. Canada (1938), one of the most important court cases in the Civil Rights Movement in the 1930s; attended Lincoln University

References

See also

List of people from Missouri

Jefferson City, Missouri
Jefferson City